Andakhudukia ponomarenkoi is a fossil species of beetle in the family Buprestidae, the only species in the genus Andakhudukia. The fossil was originally found in Mongolia, and the genus is named after the locality where it was found, Anda-Khuduk.

References

Monotypic Buprestidae genera
Fossil taxa described in 2008